Malcolm Wilson may refer to:

 Malcolm Wilson (governor) (1914–2000), Governor of New York from 1973 to 1974
 Malcolm Wilson (rally driver) (born 1956), British rally driver and motorsports personality
 Malcolm Wilson Bridge, a bridge in New York State, also known as the Tappan Zee Bridge
 Malcolm Wilson (botanist) FRSE FLS (1882–1960) Scottish botanist